Barry Lynn is the name of:

Boxcutter (musician) (born 1980), born Barry Lynn, electronic musician from Northern Ireland
Barry C. Lynn, American writer who covers global economic issues
Barry W. Lynn (born 1948), American attorney and ordained minister, best known for his leadership of Americans United for the Separation of Church and State
Barry Lynn (darts player) (born 1987), English darts player